John Poynder Dickson-Poynder, 1st Baron Islington,  (31 October 1866 – 6 December 1936), born John Poynder Dickson and known as Sir John Poynder Dickson-Poynder from 1884 to 1910, was a British politician. He was Governor of New Zealand between 1910 and 1912.

Early life
The son of Rear Admiral John Bourmaster Dickson and Sarah Matilda Dickson (née Poynder),  he was born on the Isle of Wight and educated at Twyford School, Harrow and Christ Church, Oxford. In 1884 he succeeded his uncle as sixth baronet, and on succeeding to his maternal uncle's property he assumed by royal licence the additional surname of Poynder in 1888. The Poynder estates in Wiltshire included Hilmarton near Calne, and Hartham near Corsham, where Dickson-Poynder carried out alterations c. 1888.

He married Anne Beauclerk Dundas (c.1869-1958) the daughter of James Dundas of Dundas and granddaughter of Baron Napier of Magdala. They had one daughter, Joan, who was later Joan, Lady Altrincham who organised nursing in Africa.

Member of Parliament
He was appointed High Sheriff of Wiltshire in 1890. Elected Conservative Member of Parliament for the Chippenham constituency in 1892, he joined the Liberals in 1905. He was a member of London County Council from 1898 to 1904.

In late 1902 he visited British India and attended the 1903 Delhi Durbar.

Military career 
Dickson-Poynder was first commissioned into the volunteer battalion of the Royal Scots, but transferred to the Royal Wiltshire Yeomanry where he was promoted to captain on 7 December 1898. He volunteered for active service in the Second Boer War, and was commissioned a lieutenant in the 1st Battalion (Wiltshire Company) Imperial Yeomanry on 7 February 1900, leaving Liverpool for South Africa on the SS Cymric in early March 1900. Appointed a quartermaster during the voyage (dated 10 March 1900), he was back as a regular lieutenant in the Wiltshire company of the 1st battalion the following month. He later served on the Staff as aide-de-camp to Lord Methuen, for which he was awarded the Distinguished Service Order (DSO) on 29 November 1900. Following his resignation from the Imperial Yeomanry, he was on 5 February 1901 granted the rank of honorary lieutenant of the Army. The following year, he was promoted to major in the Royal Wiltshire Yeomanry on 31 May 1902.

Governor of New Zealand

In 1910 Dickson was appointed Governor of New Zealand, a post he held for two years, and on 27 April that same year, was created Baron Islington, of Islington in the County of London. He was the last Governor of New Zealand to hold the title before it was changed to Governor-General of New Zealand during the term of his successor. He was made a KCMG and Privy Counsellor in 1911, and in 1912 was appointed President of the Royal Commission on the Public Services of India, on which he served with Lord Ronaldshay, Herbert Fisher, Mr Justice Abdur Rahim, and others.

Later career
Earlier on he was appointed for the Royal Commission on London Traffic in 1904, and worked on trade relations between Canada and the West Indies in 1909. A few years later he became Under-Secretary of State for the Colonies, and in 1915 he became Under-Secretary of State for India. He also chaired the Imperial Institute for eight years, and was in charge of the National Savings Committee from 1920 until 1926, when he was appointed a Knight Grand Cross of the Order of the British Empire (GBE), having become Knight Grand Cross of the Order of St Michael and St George (GCMG) thirteen years before.

Death
Lord Islington died on 6 December 1936 aged 70 at Hyde Park Gardens, London, and was buried at Hilmarton, Wiltshire, his barony and baronetcy becoming extinct at his death. Lady Islington subsequently rented Dyrham Park in Gloucestershire, where she ran a nursery during the Second World War.

Arms

References

External links 
 

1866 births
1936 deaths
People educated at Harrow School
Alumni of Christ Church, Oxford
Royal Scots officers
People educated at Twyford School
British Army personnel of the Second Boer War
Dickson-Poynder, John
Dickson-Poynder, John
Barons in the Peerage of the United Kingdom
Peers created by Edward VII
Companions of the Distinguished Service Order
Governors-General of New Zealand
High Sheriffs of Wiltshire
Knights Grand Cross of the Order of St Michael and St George
Knights Grand Cross of the Order of the British Empire
Dickson-Poynder, John
Members of the Privy Council of the United Kingdom
Dickson-Poynder, John
Dickson-Poynder, John
Dickson-Poynder, John
Dickson-Poynder, John
UK MPs who were granted peerages
Royal Wiltshire Yeomanry officers